The Reunion (also titled as The Reunion: Live At The Hyatt Regency 9.11.2010) is a live album released on January 11, 2015 by the Washington, D.C.-based go-go band Rare Essence. The album was recorded live at the Hyatt Regency in Crystal City, Virginia on September 11, 2010.

Track listing
"Intro" – 2:31
"I Got That Feelin'/Roll Call" – 5:42
"R.E. Herman" – 5:03
"Do You Know What Time it Is?" – 4:42
"Hey Buddy, Buddy" – 3:56
"GoGo Mickey" – 7:16
"Cherchez La R.E." – 6:21
"20 Minute Workout" – 2:27
"Uh Oh/Where My Troopers At?" – 3:26
"Where They At?" – 3:10
"Geraldine" – 3:54
"Party Lights" – 2:01
"Lock It" – 3:56
"King of the GoGo Beat" – 3:27
"Work the Walls" – 2:13
"All Da Time" – 3:24

Personnel

Andre "Whiteboy" Johnson – electric guitar, vocals
James "Jas Funk" Thomas – vocals
Darrell "Blue-Eye" Arrington – drums
Michael "Lil Mike" Smith – drums
Milton "Go-Go Mickey" Freeman – congas, percussions
Tyron "Jungle Boogie" Williams – congas, percussions
John "JB" Buchanan – flugelhorn, keyboards
Michael "Funky Ned" Neal – bass guitar
Michael Baker – bass guitar
Byron "BJ" Jackson – keyboards
Benjamin "Scotty" Haskel – keyboards
Mark "Godfather" Lawson – keyboards
Norris "Marky" Qwens – keyboards
Eric "Bojack" Butcher – percussions
Quentin "Shorty Dud" Ivey – percussions
Donnell Floyd – saxophone, vocals
Rory "DC" Felton – saxophone, trombone
Derek "DP" Paige – trumpet
Charles "Shorty Corleone" Garris – vocals
Kimberly "Ms. Kim" Graham – vocals
Kenecia "KeKe" Taylor – vocals
Bonita Glenn – vocals
Lawrence "Maniac" West – vocals
Michael Muse – vocals

References

External links
The Reunion at Discogs

2015 live albums
Rare Essence albums